Kelly Conlon (born 20 March 1969) is an American bass guitarist. He has been a hired musician with Death and Monstrosity. Conlon currently performs with Pessimist.

Career

Conlon was part of the Florida underground metal scene until 1994 when Orlando-based Chuck Schuldiner hired him to play with the American death metal band Death. He recorded the album Symbolic and went on the subsequent international "Full of Hate Festivals" tour.
Conlon joined Monstrosity, another Florida death metal band, in 1995 and played on the albums Millennium (1996) and In Dark Purity (1999). Conlon also played bass in extreme metal band Pessimist.

It was announced in August 2011 at Blabbermouth.net that Conlon was recruited to join "Arizona-based death/thrash metallers Sargon" which went on an undefined hiatus.

Conlon played on Azure Emote's "The Gravity Of Impermanence" in 2013.

References

External links
Official Website

Death (metal band) members
American heavy metal bass guitarists
American male bass guitarists
Living people
1969 births
20th-century American bass guitarists
20th-century American male musicians